Connezac is a commune in the Dordogne department in Nouvelle-Aquitaine in southwestern France. The commune consists of 5 hamlets: Connezac (where the church and the castle are located), Maine Rousset (where the town hall is located), Fontenille, Lafarge and Maine du Bost.

Population

Monuments 

 Castle of Connezac (16th and 17th century)
 Parish church Saint Martin, former chapel of the castle.

See also
Communes of the Dordogne department

References

Communes of Dordogne